Bernardo Neustadt (January 9, 1925 – June 7, 2008) was a Romanian-born Argentine journalist. For 30 years he was the TV host of the famous  news program.

Neustadt was the first to make political opinion journalism on television in Argentina. During the military dictatorship and democratic governments of Raul Alfonsin and Carlos Menem, he was one of the most influential political journalists in Argentina.

He was born on January 9, 1925, in Iași, Romania, while his father worked at the Argentine Embassy in Bucharest. Six months later, the family settled in Argentina. Between 6 and 13 years old, Neustadt was raised as a "ward" in Catholic boarding schools. After his mother died when he was 13 he moved with his father, who later expelled him from the house.

At 14 years old, he joined the Editorial Haynes, owner of the newspaper . He worked as a sportswriter and directed Racing magazine.

He died in Martinez, Buenos Aires, Argentina.

TV news program 

For 30 years between 1966 and 1997 he was the host of the Tiempo Nuevo news program. His ratings reached 30 points, the highest news program on Argentinian TV. In later years he split with Mariano Grondona and changed the program's name to Al Estilo de Bernardo Neustadt.

Interviews 
Notable interviewees include:

References

Further reading

1925 births
2008 deaths
Argentine journalists
Male journalists
Television in Argentina
Romanian emigrants to Argentina
Argentine anti-communists
20th-century journalists
People from Iași